Evrostina is a village and a former municipality in Corinthia, Peloponnese, Greece. Since the 2011 local government reform it is part of the municipality Xylokastro-Evrostina, of which it is a municipal unit. The municipal unit has an area of 101.415 km2. The seat of administration of the former municipality was the town Derveni.

Geography
Evrostina is a mountain village, situated at about 650 m elevation between the mountain Mavro oros (elevation 1757 m) to the south and the mountain Evrostina (elevation 1208 m) to the northwest. The most populous village of the municipal unit, Derveni, is 7 km to the north on the coast of the Gulf of Corinth. Evrostina is 20 km west of Xylokastro and 50 km west of Corinth.

Subdivisions
The municipal unit Evrostina is subdivided into the following communities (constituent villages in brackets):
Derveni (Derveni, Mavra Litharia, Petalou)
Elliniko
Evrostina (Evrostina, Ano Aigialos, Koumarias, Rozena)
Kallithea (Kallithea, Skoupaiika)
Lygia
Likoporia
Pyrgos
Sarantapicho (Sarantapicho, Sarantapichiotika)
Stomio
Chelydoreo (Chelydoreo, Mentourgianika)

Historical population

See also

List of settlements in Corinthia

References 

Populated places in Corinthia